Esme Melbro Grant (née Muir; 20 September 1920 – 25 August 1987) was a Jamaican politician. She was one of the first women elected to the Parliament of Jamaica.

Political career 
She was JLP candidate for Westmoreland Central in the 1962 Jamaican general election. She impressed the party leader that she was made the first female parliamentary secretary of independent Jamaica — working at the education ministry. In the 1967 general election she was elected in Westmoreland North Eastern but lost to Jim Thompson in the 1972 general election.

She was acting Minister of Labour and National Insurance in the 1970s. She resigned from the Senate of Jamaica in 1976.

References 

1920 births
1987 deaths
Women government ministers of Jamaica
Government ministers of Jamaica
20th-century Jamaican women politicians
20th-century Jamaican politicians
Jamaica Labour Party politicians
Members of the House of Representatives of Jamaica
Members of the Senate of Jamaica
Jamaican schoolteachers